Bleeding Bull is the debut EP by Canadian rapper Jimmy Prime. The production duties on the six-track EP were handled by STWO, Wonda Gurl, Murda Beatz and Arthur McArthur and it was released on March 28, 2017. The EP received a 6/10 by Scott Glaysher of Exclaim!, who described the EP as "not [Jimmy Prime's] best work to date, but he's stayed true to his sound, something he holds dear."

Track listing

 "Intro" – 1:33
 "My Way" – 2:40
 "Pisces" – 3:11
 "Digital Money" – 2:06
 "Gucci Denim" – 3:57
 "Moscow Mule" – 3:17

Personnel
Amir Jamm – producer on "My Way"
Arthur McArthur – producer on "My Way", "Pisces", "Gucci Denim" and "Moscow Mule"
Murda Beatz – producer on "Digital Money"
Stwo – producer on "Digital Money"
Wonda Gurl – producer on "Intro"

References

Jimmy Prime albums
2017 EPs
Hip hop EPs